Savignia basarukini is a species of sheet weaver spiders found in Russia. It was described by Eskov in 1988.

References

Linyphiidae
Endemic fauna of Russia
Spiders described in 1988